Ferrari S.p.A. is an Italian luxury sports car manufacturer based in Maranello, Italy. Founded by Enzo Ferrari (1898–1988) in 1939 from the Alfa Romeo racing division as Auto Avio Costruzioni, the company built its first car in 1940, and produced its first Ferrari-badged car in 1947.

Fiat S.p.A. acquired 50% of Ferrari in 1969 and expanded its stake to 90% in 1988. In October 2014, Fiat Chrysler Automobiles (FCA) announced its intentions to separate Ferrari S.p.A. from FCA; as of the announcement FCA owned 90% of Ferrari. The separation began in October 2015 with a restructuring that established Ferrari N.V. (a company incorporated in the Netherlands) as the new holding company of the Ferrari S.p.A. group, and the subsequent sale by FCA of 10% of the shares in an IPO and concurrent listing of common shares on the New York Stock Exchange. Through the remaining steps of the separation, FCA's interest in Ferrari's business was distributed to shareholders of FCA, with 10% continuing to be owned by Piero Ferrari. The spin-off was completed on the 3rd of January 2016.

Throughout its history, the company has been noted for its continued participation in racing, especially in Formula One, where it is the oldest and most successful racing team, holding the most constructors' championships (16) and having produced the highest number of drivers' championship wins (15). Ferrari road cars are generally seen as a symbol of speed, luxury and wealth. Ferrari cars are built at the 165,000 square-metre (16.5-hectare) Maranello factory. In 2014 Ferrari was rated the world's most powerful brand by Brand Finance. As of 2021, Ferrari is the 10th-largest car manufacturer by market capitalisation, with $52.21 billion.

History 

Enzo Ferrari was not initially interested in the idea of producing road cars when he formed Scuderia Ferrari in 1929, with headquarters in Modena. Scuderia Ferrari (pronounced ) literally means "Ferrari Stable" and is usually used to mean "Team Ferrari". Ferrari bought, prepared, and fielded Alfa Romeo racing cars for gentleman drivers, functioning as the racing division of Alfa Romeo. In 1933, Alfa Romeo withdrew its in-house racing team and Scuderia Ferrari took over as its works team: the Scuderia received Alfa's Grand Prix cars of the latest specifications and fielded many famous drivers such as Tazio Nuvolari and Achille Varzi. In 1938, Alfa Romeo again brought its racing operation in-house, forming Alfa Corse in Milan and hired Enzo Ferrari as manager of the new racing department; thereby disbanding the Scuderia Ferrari.

In September 1939, Ferrari left Alfa Romeo under the provision he would not use the Ferrari name in association with races or racing cars for at least four years. A few days later he founded Auto Avio Costruzioni, with headquarters in the facilities of the old Scuderia Ferrari. The new company ostensibly produced machine tools and aircraft accessories. In 1940, Ferrari produced a racing car – the Tipo 815, based on a Fiat platform. It was the first Ferrari car and debuted at the 1940 Mille Miglia, but due to World War II it saw little competition. In 1943, the Ferrari factory moved to Maranello, where it has remained ever since. The factory was bombed by the Allies and subsequently rebuilt including works for road car production.

The first Ferrari-badged car was the 1947 125 S, powered by a 1.5 L V12 engine; Enzo Ferrari reluctantly built and sold his automobiles to fund Scuderia Ferrari.

The Scuderia Ferrari name was resurrected to denote the factory racing cars and distinguish them from those fielded by customer teams.

In 1960, the company was restructured as a public corporation under the name SEFAC S.p.A. (Società Esercizio Fabbriche Automobili e Corse).

Early in 1969, Fiat took a 50% stake in Ferrari. An immediate result was an increase in available investment funds, and work started at once on a factory extension intended to transfer production from Fiat's Turin plant of the Ferrari-engined Fiat Dino. New model investment further up in the Ferrari range also received a boost.

In 1988, Enzo Ferrari oversaw the launch of the Ferrari F40, the last new Ferrari launched before his death later that year. In 1989, the company was renamed Ferrari S.p.A. From 2002 to 2004, Ferrari produced the Enzo, their fastest model at the time, which was introduced and named in honour of the company's founder, Enzo Ferrari. It was to be called the F60, continuing on from the F40 and F50, but Ferrari was so pleased with it, they called it the Enzo instead. It was initially offered to loyal and recurring customers, each of the 399 made (minus the 400th which was donated to the Vatican for charity) had a price tag of $650,000 apiece (equivalent to £400,900).

On 15 September 2012, 964 Ferrari cars worth over $162 million (£99.95 million) attended the Ferrari Driving Days event at Silverstone Circuit and paraded round the Silverstone Circuit setting a world record.

Ferrari's former CEO and Chairman, Luca di Montezemolo, resigned from the company after 23 years, who was succeeded by Amedeo Felisa and finally on 3 May 2016 Amedeo resigned and was succeeded by Sergio Marchionne, CEO and Chairman of Fiat Chrysler Automobiles, Ferrari's parent company. In July 2018, Marchionne was replaced by board member Louis Camilleri as CEO and by John Elkann as chairman.

On 29 October 2014, the FCA group, resulting from the merger between manufacturers Fiat and Chrysler, announced the split of its luxury brand, Ferrari. The aim was to turn Ferrari into an independent brand, 10% of whose stake would be sold in an IPO in 2015. Ferrari officially priced its initial public offering at $52 a share after the market close on 20 October 2015.

On 10 December 2020, CEO Louis Camilleri announced that he will step down as CEO and chairman John Elkann will step in to the Interim CEO role until a permanent successor is selected.

On 9 June 2021, the company announced the appointment of Benedetto Vigna from Geneva-based STMicroelectronics as its next CEO starting September.

Motorsport 

Since the company's beginnings, Ferrari has been involved in motorsport, competing in a range of categories including Formula One and sports car racing through its Scuderia Ferrari sporting division as well as supplying cars and engines to other teams and for one-make race series.

1940 AAC 815 was the first racing car to be designed by Enzo Ferrari, although it was not badged as a Ferrari model.

Scuderia Ferrari 

Scuderia Ferrari has participated in several classes of motorsport, though it is currently only officially involved in Formula One. It is the only team to have competed in the Formula One World Championship continuously since its inception in 1950. José Froilán González gave the team its first F1 victory at the 1951 British Grand Prix.

Alberto Ascari gave Ferrari its first Drivers Championship a year later. Ferrari is the oldest team in the championship, and the most successful: the team holds nearly every Formula One record. , the team's records include 15 World Drivers Championship titles, 16 World Constructors Championship titles, 221 Grand Prix victories, 6736.27 points, 679 podium finishes, 207 pole positions, and 230 fastest laps in 890 Grands Prix contested. Of the 19 tracks used in 2014, 8 have lap records set by the F2004, with a further 3 set by the F2003-GA, F2008 and F10.

Ferrari drivers include: Tazio Nuvolari, José Froilán González, Juan Manuel Fangio, Alberto Ascari, Luigi Chinetti, Eugenio Castellotti, Maurice Trintignant, Wolfgang von Trips, Phil Hill, Olivier Gendebien, Mike Hawthorn, Peter Collins, Giancarlo Baghetti, Ricardo Rodríguez, Chris Amon, John Surtees, Lorenzo Bandini, Ludovico Scarfiotti, Jacky Ickx, Mario Andretti, Clay Regazzoni, Niki Lauda, Carlos Reutemann, Jody Scheckter, Gilles Villeneuve, Didier Pironi, Patrick Tambay, René Arnoux, Michele Alboreto, Gerhard Berger, Nigel Mansell, Alain Prost, Jean Alesi, Michael Schumacher, Eddie Irvine, Rubens Barrichello, Felipe Massa, Kimi Räikkönen, Fernando Alonso, Sebastian Vettel, Charles Leclerc and Carlos Sainz Jr.

At the end of the 2006 season, the team courted controversy by continuing to allow Marlboro to sponsor them after they, along with the other F1 teams, made a promise to end sponsorship deals with tobacco manufacturers. A five-year deal was agreed and although this was not due to end until 2011, in April 2008 Marlboro dropped their on-car branding on Ferrari.

In addition to Formula One, Ferrari also entered cars in sportscar racing, the two programs existing in parallel for many years.

In 1949, Luigi Chinetti drove a 166 M to Ferrari's first win in motorsports, the 24 Hours of Le Mans. Ferrari went on to dominate the early years of the World Sportscar Championship which was created in 1953, winning the title seven out of its first nine years.

When the championship format changed in 1962, Ferrari earned titles in at least one class each year through to 1965 and then again in 1967. Ferrari would win one final title, the 1972 World Championship of Makes before Enzo decided to leave sports car racing after 1973 and allow Scuderia Ferrari to concentrate solely on Formula One.

Although Scuderia Ferrari no longer participated in sports cars after 1973, they have occasionally built various successful sports cars for privateers. These include the 512 BB LM in the 1970s, the 333 SP which won the IMSA GT Championship in the 1990s, and currently the 458 GT2 and GT3 which are currently winning championships in their respective classes.

Competizioni GT official drivers

Race cars for other teams 

Throughout its history, Ferrari has supplied racing cars to other entrants, aside from its own works Scuderia Ferrari team.

In the 1950s and '60s, Ferrari supplied Formula One cars to a number of private entrants and other teams. One famous example was Tony Vandervell's team, which raced the Thinwall Special modified Ferraris before building their own Vanwall cars. The North American Racing Team's entries in the final three rounds of the 1969 season were the last occasions on which a team other than Scuderia Ferrari entered a World Championship Grand Prix with a Ferrari car.

Ferrari supplied cars complete with V8 engines for the A1 Grand Prix series, from the 2008–09 season. The car was designed by Rory Byrne and is styled to resemble the 2004 Ferrari Formula one car.

Ferrari currently runs a customer GT program for a racing version of its 458 and has done so for the 458's predecessors, dating back to the 355 in the late 1990s. Such private teams as the American Risi Competizione and Italian AF Corse teams have been very successful with Ferrari GT racers over the years. This car, made for endurance sportscar racing to compete against such racing versions of the Audi R8, McLaren MP4-12C, and BMW Z4 (E89) has proven to be successful, but not as successful as its predecessor, the F430. The Ferrari Challenge is a one-make racing series for the Ferrari 458. The FXX is not road legal and is therefore only used for track events.

Road cars 

The first vehicle made with the Ferrari name was the 125 S. Only two of this small two-seat sports/racing V12 car were made. In 1949, the 166 Inter was introduced marking the company's significant move into the grand touring road car market. The first 166 Inter was a four-seat (2+2) berlinetta coupe with body work designed by Carrozzeria Touring Superleggera. Road cars quickly became the bulk of Ferrari sales.

The early Ferrari cars typically featured bodywork designed and customised by independent coachbuilders such as Pininfarina, Scaglietti, Zagato, Vignale and Bertone.

The original road cars were typically two-seat front-engined V12s. This platform served Ferrari very well through the 1950s and 1960s. In 1968 the Dino was introduced as the first two-seat rear mid-engined Ferrari. The Dino was produced primarily with a V6 engine, however, a V8 model was also developed. This rear mid-engine layout would go on to be used in many Ferraris of the 1980s, 1990s and to the present day. Current road cars typically use V8 or V12 engines, with V8 models making up well over half of the marque's total production. Historically, Ferrari has also produced flat 12 engines.

For a time, Ferrari built 2+2 versions of its mid-engined V8 cars. Although they looked quite different from their 2-seat counterparts, both the GT4 and Mondial were closely related to the 308 GTB.

Ferrari entered the mid-engined 12-cylinder fray with the Berlinetta Boxer in 1973. The later Testarossa (also mid-engined 12 cylinders) remains one of the most popular and famous Ferrari road cars of all time.

The company has also produced several front-engined 2+2 cars, culminating in the recent V12 model Lusso and V8 models Roma, Portofino and Lusso T. The California is credited with initiating the popular current model line of V8 front-engined 2+2 grand touring performance sports cars.

Starting in the early 2010s with the LaFerrari, the focus was shifted away from the use of independent coach builders to what is now the standard, Ferrari relying on in-house design from the Centro Stile Ferrari for the design of all its road cars.

Current models

Customization 

In the 1950s and 1960s, clients often personalized their vehicles as they came straight from the factory. This philosophy added to the mystique of the brand. Every Ferrari that comes out of Maranello is built to an individual customer's specification. In this sense, each vehicle is a unique result of a specific client's desire.

Ferrari formalized this concept with its earlier Carrozzeria Scaglietti programme. The options offered here were more typical such as racing seats, rearview cameras, and other special trim. In late 2011, Ferrari announced a significant update of this philosophy. The Tailor Made programme allows clients to work with designers in Maranello to make decisions at every step of the process. Through this program almost any trim, any exterior color or any interior material is possible. The program carries on the original tradition and emphasizes the idea of each car being unique.

Supercars 

The 1984 288 GTO may be considered the first in the line of Ferrari supercars. This pedigree extends through the Enzo Ferrari to the LaFerrari. In February 2019, at the 89th Geneva International Motor Show, Ferrari revealed its latest mid-engine V8 supercar, the F8 Tributo.

Ferrari SF90 Stradale is the first-ever Ferrari to feature PHEV (Plug-in Hybrid Electric Vehicle) architecture which sees the internal combustion engine integrated with three electric motors, two of which are independent and located on the front axle, with the third at the rear between the engine and the gearbox.

Concept cars and specials 
Ferrari has produced a number of concept cars, such as the Mythos. While some of these were quite radical (such as the Modulo) and never intended for production, others such as the Mythos have shown styling elements that were later incorporated into production models.

The most recent concept car to be produced by Ferrari themselves was the 2010 Millechili.

A number of one-off special versions of Ferrari road cars have also been produced, commissioned to coachbuilders by wealthy owners. Recent examples include the P4/5 and the 612 Kappa.

Ferrari Special Projects
The Special Projects programme, also called the Portfolio Coachbuilding Programme, was launched in 2008 as a way to revive the tradition of past one-off and limited production coachbuilt Ferrari models, allowing clients to work with Ferrari and top Italian coachbuilders to create bespoke bodied models based on modern Ferrari road cars. Engineering and design is done by Ferrari, sometimes in cooperation with external design houses like Pininfarina or Fioravanti, and the vehicles receive full homologation to be road legal. Since the creation of Ferrari's in-house styling centre in 2010 though, the focus has shifted away somewhat from outside coachbuilders and more towards creating new in-house designs for clients.

The first car to be completed under this programme was the 2008 SP1, commissioned by a Japanese business executive. The second was the P540 Superfast Aperta, commissioned by an American collector. The following is a list of Special Projects cars that have been made public:

Bio-fuel and hybrid cars 

An F430 Spider that runs on ethanol was displayed at the 2008 Detroit Auto Show. At the 2010 Geneva Motor Show, Ferrari unveiled a hybrid version of their flagship 599. Called the "HY-KERS Concept", Ferrari's hybrid system adds more than 100 horsepower on top of the 599 Fiorano's 612 HP. Also in mid-2014, the flagship LaFerrari was put into production.

Naming conventions 

From the beginning, the Ferrari naming convention consisted of a three-digit unitary displacement of an engine cylinder with an additional suffix representing the purpose of a vehicle. Therefore, Ferrari 125 S had  V12 engine with a unitary displacement of 124.73 cc; whilst S-suffix represented Sport. Other race cars also received names invoking particular races like Ferrari 166 MM for Mille Miglia. With the introduction of road-going models, the suffix Inter was added, inspired by the Scuderia Inter racing team of Igor Troubetzkoy. Popular at that time 166-series had  engines with 166.25 cc of unitary displacement and a very diverse 250-series had  of total displacement and 246.10 cc of unitary. Later series of road cars were renamed Europa and top-of-the-line series America and Superamerica.

Until the early 1990s, Ferrari followed a three-number naming scheme based on engine displacement and a number of cylinders:

 V6 and V8 models used the total displacement (in decilitres) for the first two digits and the number of cylinders as the third. Thus, the 206 was a 2.0 L V6 powered vehicle, while the 348 used a 3.4 L V8, although, for the F355, the last digit refers to 5 valves per cylinder. Upon introduction of the 360 Modena, the digits for V8 models (which now carried a name as well as a number) refer only to total engine displacement. The numerical indication aspect of this name carried on to the F430; the F430's replacement, the 458 Italia, uses the same naming as the 206 and 348. The 488 uses the system formerly used by the V12 cars.
 V12 models used the displacement (in cubic centimetres) of one cylinder. Therefore, the famed 365 Daytona had a  V12. However, some newer V12-engined Ferraris, such as the 599, have three-number designations that refer only to total engine displacement or boxer-style designations such as the [nominally] six-litre, V12 612.
 Flat 12 models used the displacement in litres for the first digit and the number of cylinders for the next two digits. Therefore, the 512 BB was five-litre flat 12 (a Berlinetta Boxer, in this case). However, the original Berlinetta Boxer was the 365 GT4 BB, which was named in a similar manner to the V12 models.
 Flagship models (aka "halo cars") use the letter F followed by the anniversary in years, such as the F40 and F50. The Enzo skipped this rule, although the F60 name was applied to a Ferrari Formula One car and is sometimes attached to the Enzo.
 Some models, such as the 1980 Mondial and 1984 Testarossa did not follow a three-number naming scheme.

Most Ferraris were also given designations referring to their body style. In general, the following conventions were used:

 M ("Modificata"), placed at the end of a model's number, denotes a modified version of its predecessor and not a complete evolution (see F512 M and 575 M Maranello).
 GTB ("Gran Turismo Berlinetta") models are closed Berlinettas, or coupés.
 GTS ("Gran Turismo Scoperta") this suffix can be seen in older spiders, or convertibles (see 365 GTS/4). Now the convertible models use the suffix "Spider" (spelt "i") (see F355 Spider, and 360 Spider). In more recent models, this suffix is used for targa top models (see Dino 246 GTS, and F355 GTS), which is an absolutely correct use of the suffix since "scoperta" means "uncovered". An increasing number of people tend to refer to GTS as "Gran Turismo Spyder", which creates the false assumption that Ferrari does not know the difference between "spyder" and "targa". The 348 TS, which is the only targa named differently, is an exception.
 GTO ("Gran Turismo Omologata"), placed at the end of a model's number, denotes a modified version of its predecessor. It designates a model that has been designed and improved for racetrack use while still being street legal. Only three models bear those three letters: the 250 GTO of 1962, the 288 GTO of 1984, and the 599 GTO of 2010.

This naming system can be confusing, as some entirely different vehicles used the same engine type and body style. Many Ferraris also had other names affixed (like Daytona) to identify them further. Many such names are actually not official factory names. The Daytona name commemorates Ferrari's triple success in the February 1967 24 Hours of Daytona with the 330 P4. Only in the 1973 Daytona 24 Hours, a 365 GTB/4 run by NART (who raced Ferraris in America) ran second, behind a Porsche 911.

The various Dino models were named for Enzo's son, Dino Ferrari, and were marketed as Dinos by Ferrari and sold at Ferrari dealersfor all intents and purposes they are Ferraris.

In the mid-1990s, Ferrari added the letter "F" to the beginning of all models (a practice abandoned after the F512 M and F355, but adopted again with the F430, but not with its successor, the Ferrari 458).

Identity

The "Prancing Horse" 

Ferrari's symbol is the "Prancing Horse", a prancing (or rearing) black horse on a yellow background. Minor details of its appearance have changed many times, but its shape has remained consistent: it is always presented either as a shield, with the Italian tricolour above the horse and the initials SF ("Scuderia Ferrari") below; or as a rectangle, replacing "SF" with the word "Ferrari" rendered in the company's trademark typeface. The shield is most closely associated with racing vehicles, the rectangle with road vehicles.

Enzo Ferrari offered an account of the horse's origins. In his story, after a 1923 victory in Ravenna, the family of Count Francesco Baracca, a deceased flying ace who painted the emblem on his airplane, paid him a visit. Countess Paolina Biancoli, Francesco's mother, suggested that Ferrari adopt the horse as a good luck charm: he accepted the request, and the Prancing Horse was first used by his racing team in 1932, applied to their Alfa Romeo 8C with the addition of a canary yellow background — the "colour of Modena," Enzo's hometown. The rectangular Prancing Horse has been used since 1947, when the Ferrari 125 S — also the first Ferrari car — became the first to wear it.

Colour 

For many years, rosso corsa ("racing red") was the required colour of all Italian racing cars. It is also closely associated with Ferrari: even after livery regulations changed, allowing race teams to deviate from their national colours, Scuderia Ferrari continued to paint its cars bright red, as it does to this day. On Ferrari's road-going cars, the colour has always been among the company's most popular choices: in 2018, 40 percent of Ferraris left the factory painted red, while in the early 1990s the figure was even higher, at 85 percent. Some Ferrari vehicles, like the 288 GTO, have only been made available in red.

Although rosso corsa is thought to be the definitive Ferrari colour, it has not always been the colour of choice. Ferraris fielded by privateers have run in a rainbow of colours, and one of the company's own early Formula One liveries was a distinctive dark green. In a particularly noteworthy case from 1964, while protesting the FIA's homologation requirements, the company moved its racing assets to NART, an affiliated, United States-based racing team. As a result, for the 1964 Mexican Grand Prix, Ferrari's cars were painted in American colours — white with blue racing stripes. Red has also become less popular on Ferrari's road cars, a phenomenon which the company attributes to the popularity of its customisation programmes.

Speaking to both the iconic nature of rosso corsa and the power of the Ferrari brand, Enzo Ferrari is reported to have once said the following: "Ask a child to draw a car, and he will certainly paint it red."

Brand image 

Ferrari meticulously manages its brand image and public perception: it goes to great lengths to protect its trademarks, and its customers are expected to honour its rules and guidelines when caring for their cars. The company is noted for its frequent and diverse lawsuits, which have centred around such subjects as the shape of the Ferrari 250 GTO's bodywork, exclusive rights to its model names (including "Testarossa" and "Purosangue"), replica vehicles, and several unsanctioned owner modifications.

Ferrari aims to cultivate an image of exclusivity and refined luxury. To facilitate this, vehicle production is deliberately limited to below customer demand, and purchasers are internally ranked based on their desirability and loyalty. The company's most exclusive supercars, such as the LaFerrari, may have wait lists multiple times in excess of total production, with only the most loyal customers selected to purchase one. Sometimes, Ferrari's desire to maintain this perception goes against the wishes of its clientele; in one case, the company sued the fashion designer Philipp Plein over "distasteful" Instagram posts featuring his personal 812 Superfast. The posts, which showcased two models in suggestive positions atop the car, were seen by Ferrari as "unlawfully appropriating" the Ferrari brand to promote Plein's clothing, and as being outside Ferrari's intended brand perception.

Furthermore, the company places restrictions on what owners may do with their cars: they are not allowed to undertake certain modifications, and the company's right of first refusal contract, designed to discourage speculation and flipping, prohibits unauthorised sales within the first two years of ownership. Purchasers who break these rules are placed on a "blacklist," and may not be permitted to buy a Ferrari vehicle through official means. These owner restrictions came to high profile in 2014, when the musician Deadmau5 was sent a cease and desist letter regarding his highly customised Ferrari 458: the car, which he dubbed the "Purrari," possessed custom badges and a Nyan Cat-themed wrap, and was almost sold on Craigslist before Ferrari's legal team intervened.

Ferrari does encourage its buyers to personalize their cars, but only through official channels, which include its Tailor Made programme for bespoke trim packages and special coachbuilding initiatives for more demanding commissions. The customisation options offered through these channels are extensive, though they are always in line with Ferrari's desired branding — for example, the company offers no pink paint for its cars. In 2017, the CEO of the company's Australasia branch commented that this and similar customisations are "against the company's ethos," and that such a stance is "a brand rule. No pink. No Pokémon Ferraris!"

Corporate affairs 

In 1963, Enzo Ferrari was approached by the Ford Motor Company about a possible buy out. Ford audited Ferrari's assets but legal negotiations and talks were unilaterally cut off by Ferrari when he realized that the deal offered by Ford would not enable him to stay at the helm of the company racing program. Henry Ford II consequently directed his racing division to negotiate with Lotus, Lola, and Cooper to build a car capable of beating Ferrari on the world endurance circuit, eventually resulting in the production of the Ford GT40 in 1964.

As the Ford deal fell through, FIAT approached Ferrari with a more flexible proposal and purchased controlling interests in the company in 1969. Enzo Ferrari retained a 10% share, which is currently owned by his son Piero Lardi Ferrari.

Ferrari has an internally managed merchandising line that licenses many products bearing the Ferrari brand, including eyewear, pens, pencils, electronic goods, perfume, cologne, clothing, high-tech bicycles, watches, cell phones, and laptop computers.

Ferrari also runs a museum, the Museo Ferrari in Maranello, which displays road and race cars and other items from the company's history.

Formula Uomo programme 

In 1997, Ferrari launched a long term master planned effort to improve overall corporate efficiency, production and employee happiness. The program was called Formula Uomo and became a case study in social sustainability. It took over ten years to fully implement and included over €200 million (2008) in investment.

Technical partnerships 

Ferrari has had a long-standing relationship with Shell Oil. It is a technical partnership with Ferrari and Ducati to test as well as supply fuel and oils to the Formula One, MotoGP and World Superbike racing teams. For example, the Shell V-Power premium gasoline fuel has been developed with the many years of technical expertise between Shell and Ferrari.

Ferrari has had agreements to supply Formula One engines to a number of other teams over the years, and currently supply the Alfa Romeo and Haas F1 F1 teams.

Sales history 
As of the end of 2019, the total of Ferrari built and sold cars in their whole company history is 219,062.

Annual Ferrari sales to end customers (number of type-approved vehicles)

Recalls  
In January 2020 the Italian carmaker said it will recall 982 vehicles for passenger airbags due to the Takata airbag recalls. If the inflator explodes, the airbag will spew metal shrapnel at passengers, which can cause severe injury. Every car involved will get a new passenger-side airbag assembly, complete with a new inflator without the dangerous propellant.  

On 8 August 2022, the company recalled almost every car it's sold in the US since 2005 over a potential for brake failure. According to an NHTSA recall filing, 23,555 Ferrari models sold in America are fitted with a potentially faulty brake fluid reservoir cap that may not vent pressure adequately. The fix is simple.

Stores 
Roughly thirty Ferrari boutiques exist worldwide, with two owned by Ferrari and the rest operating as franchises. The stores sell branded clothes, accessories and racing memorabilia. Clothing includes upscale and lower-priced collections for men, women, and children.

Some stores include race car simulation games for entertainment.

Attractions 
There are currently two Ferrari-themed amusement parks in the world.

Ferrari World Abu Dhabi 

Opened in 2010, Ferrari World Abu Dhabi is the first Ferrari-branded theme park in the world and boasts 37 rides and attractions. Located on Yas Island in Abu Dhabi, it is home to the world's fastest roller coaster - Formula Rossa, and a dynamic coaster with one of the world's tallest loop - Flying Aces.

Ferrari Land in PortAventura 

Opened in 2017, Ferrari Land in PortAventura World resort is the second such Ferrari-themed amusement park in the world, after Ferrari World Abu Dhabi. With 16 rides and attractions, it is home to Europe's fastest and highest vertical accelerator coaster - Red Force.

See also 

 List of Ferrari road cars
 List of Ferrari engines
 List of Ferrari competition cars
 List of Ferrari engines
 Scuderia Ferrari
 List of car brands
 List of companies of Italy

Citations

General references 
 
 Adler, Dennis, Ferrari: The Road from Maranello. Random House, 2006. .

External links 

 
 Ferrari Official Car Configurator
 Ferrari Past Models on auto.ferrari.com
 Ferrari Single-seaters on formula1.ferrari.com
 Ferrari Special Projects listing on Coachbuild.com
 

 
Italian companies established in 1947
2015 initial public offerings
Automotive companies established in 1947
Car manufacturers of Italy
Companies listed on the Borsa Italiana
Companies listed on the New York Stock Exchange
Italian brands
Luxury motor vehicle manufacturers
Sports car manufacturers
Vehicle manufacturing companies established in 1947
Car brands
Corporate spin-offs
Enzo Ferrari